James David Salmond  (1 May 1898 – 1 April 1976) was a notable New Zealand teacher, Presbyterian minister and religious educationalist. He was born in Queenstown, New Zealand, in 1898. His mother was amateur astronomer Sarah Salmond.

In the 1962 Queen's Birthday Honours, Salmond was appointed an Officer of the Order of the British Empire, for services to the community, especially in connection with youth work and Christian education for the Presbyterian Church.

References

1898 births
1976 deaths
New Zealand Presbyterians
New Zealand schoolteachers
People from Queenstown, New Zealand
People educated at Gore High School
New Zealand Officers of the Order of the British Empire